Wires Under Tension are an American post-rock band from New York City.

History
Wires Under Tension was founded by Christopher Tignor, a classically trained violinist, and drummer Theo Metz. Tignor is also a member of the band Slow Six and has done software design for Google. The initial impetus for founding the band grew out of Tignor's eviction from a Brooklyn apartment space where much of Slow Six's practice and composition had been carried out; the apartment building he had been living in was condemned after a fire marshal inspection. Tignor then moved to The Bronx and began working with Metz as a duo, culminating in the release of the full-length Light Science in early 2011.

Discography
Light Science (Western Vinyl, 2011)
Replicant (Western Vinyl, 2012)

References

American post-rock groups
Musical groups established in 2009
Musical groups from New York City
Rock music groups from New York (state)
Western Vinyl artists